Dallas Divide (el. ) is a high mountain pass in the United States state of Colorado located on State Highway 62 about  west of the town of Ridgway.

The pass is a saddle between the San Juan Mountains to the south and the Uncompahgre Plateau to the north and divides the Uncompahgre River watershed from the San Miguel River watershed and Ouray County from San Miguel County.  The pass takes its name from Dallas Creek which drains the basin on the north side of Mount Sneffels into the Uncompahgre River. The divide's namesake is George M. Dallas, 11th Vice President of the United States.

A toll road was first constructed over Dallas Divide in 1880 linking the town of Dallas near Ridgway with Telluride.  In 1890 the Rio Grande Southern Railroad was built over the divide from Ridgway to Telluride.

See also
:Category:Mountain passes of Colorado
Ouray County, Colorado
San Juan Mountains
San Juan Skyway National Scenic Byway
San Miguel County, Colorado

References

External links

USGS TopoZone Entry
Photos At Dallas Divide

Mountain passes of Colorado
Landforms of Ouray County, Colorado
Landforms of San Miguel County, Colorado
Roads in Ouray County, Colorado
Transportation in San Miguel County, Colorado
San Juan Mountains (Colorado)
Rail mountain passes of the United States